The 2012–13 Brown Bears men's basketball team represented Brown University during the 2011–12 NCAA Division I men's basketball season. The Bears, led by first year head coach Mike Martin, played their home games at the Pizzitola Sports Center and were members of the Ivy League. They finished the season 13–15, 7–7 in Ivy League play to finish in fourth place.

Roster

Schedule

|-
!colspan=9| Regular Season

References

Brown Bears men's basketball seasons
Brown
Brown
Brown